Zoucheng is a county-level city in the south of Shandong province, China. Before it became a city, it was known as Zou County or Zouxian.

Zoucheng is located about 20 km south of the city of Qufu, and like Qufu, is administratively under the prefecture-level city of Jining. Its population was 1,116,692 at the 2010 census even though its built-up (or metro) area is much smaller.

Administrative divisions
Three subdistricts:
Gangshan Subdistrict, Qianquan Subdistrict, Fushan Subdistrict

Thirteen towns:
Xiangcheng, Chengqian, Dashu, Beisu, Zhongxindian, Tangcun, Taiping, Shiqiang, Yishan, Kanzhuang, Zhangzhuang, Tianhuang, Guoli

Historical sites 
The philosopher Mencius was born in Zoucheng, then within the feudal State of Zou. His descendants lived in Zoucheng all the way to the present. Some of them migrated to Taiwan after the Chinese Civil War. In the present day, there are four major sites in the city relating to Mencius: the Mencius Temple, the Mencius Family Mansion, the Mencius Forest, and Mencius' Mother's Forest.

Its history dates back to the year 1037 in the Northern Song dynasty. The Mencius Mansion, where his descendants lived, is adjacent to the temple, and has 116 halls and rooms.

According to the management of the Mencius Temple, the temple grounds house over 270 stone steles and sculptures, some of which dating from as early as the Song dynasty. Among them are some Yuan dynasty stelae with inscriptions in 'Phags-pa script.

Immediately to the north of Zoucheng lies the tomb of the King of Lu of the Ming dynasty. It is the tomb of Zhu Tan (1370-1389), the tenth son of the Hongwu Emperor of the Ming dynasty. There is also a royal tomb from the Han dynasty.

Climate

Transportation
 Zoucheng Railway Station on the Beijing-Shanghai Railway
 Frequent bus service to the nearby Qufu and Yanzhou.

Monorail 
A , 12 station monorail to connect Qufu and Zoucheng began construction in the first half of 2017, however construction was halted.  A  section was due to be completed in January 2018 to allow for testing to commence.  The complete line was originally due to open in 2018.  As of July 2021 the local government hopes to complete the line.

References

External links
Zoucheng municipal website 

 
Cities in Shandong
Jining
County-level divisions of Shandong